Brigadier-General Hugh James Archdale  (15 January 1854 – 31 August 1921) was a British Army officer.

Military career
Educated at Cheltenham College, Archdale was commissioned into the Royal Welch Fusiliers in 1875. After serving in Sudan, Burma and Crete, Archdale saw action in the Second Boer War for which he was appointed a Companion of the Order of the Bath. He became commandant of the Imperial Yeomanry Discharge Depot at Aldershot in 1903 and General Officer Commanding the North Midland Division in April 1908 before retiring in January 1911.

References

1854 births
1921 deaths
British Army brigadiers
Companions of the Order of the Bath
Companions of the Order of St Michael and St George
Royal Welch Fusiliers officers
People educated at Cheltenham College
Military personnel from London